This page lists board and card games, wargames, miniatures games, and tabletop role-playing games published in 1999.  For video games, see 1999 in video gaming.

Games released or invented in 1999

Game awards given in 1999
 Concours International de Créateurs de Jeux de Société: Vinci
 Origins Awards: Button Men -  Best Abstract Board Game and Best Graphic Presentation of a Board Game
 Games: Torres
 Spiel des Jahres: Tikal - Michael Kiesling and Wolfgang Kramer, Ravensburger

Significant games-related events of 1999
Hasbro purchases Wizards of the Coast for US$325 million.
Z-Man Games incorporated by owner Zev Schlasinger.

Deaths

See also
 1999 in video gaming

Games
Games by year